is a railway station in the town of Tsunan, Nakauonuma District, Niigata Prefecture, Japan operated by East Japan Railway Company (JR East).

Lines
Echigo-Tanaka Station is served by the Iiyama Line, and is 54.9 kilometers from the starting point of the line at Toyono Station.

Station layout
The station consists of one side platform serving a single bi-directional track. The station is unattended.

History
Echigo-Tanaka Station opened on 1 August 1927. With the privatization of Japanese National Railways (JNR) on 1 April 1987, the station came under the control of JR East. A new station building was completed in 1998.

Surrounding area

See also
 List of railway stations in Japan

External links

 JR East station information 

Railway stations in Niigata Prefecture
Railway stations in Japan opened in 1927
Iiyama Line
Tsunan, Niigata